An Institute of International Studies or Institute for International Studies is a type of research center that focuses on international studies, international relations, or area studies. It is often, though not always, part of a university or college where it is often affiliated with, and sometimes funded by, a university's public policy, public administration, or international relations school, a degree-granting institution. These centers may also provide geographic areas of specializations, offer internship or study-abroad opportunities, and/or give support services to university students.

One of the earliest centers for international studies was founded in 1935 at Yale University. The Yale Institute of International Studies (1935-1951) sought to establish a central point of contact for teaching and research on international affairs, societies, and cultures. Its successor today is the MacMillan Center for International and Area Studies. Some scholars felt that scholars at the institute conducted too much research as individuals rather than in groups. Eight of these scholars moved to Princeton University where they founded the Center of International Studies in 1951. Institutes similar to those at Yale and Princeton soon emerged in the 1950s at Harvard University and the Massachusetts Institute of Technology.

Some of these institutions are think tanks and focus on both military strategy and international diplomacy (the two being interlinked). Examples include the International Institute for Strategic Studies and the Center for Strategic and International Studies. This article focuses mainly on the academic institutes.

United States

Other countries
 Institute for International Studies at University of Technology Sydney, Australia
 Center for International Legal Studies, Austria
 Montreal Centre for International Studies of the University of Montréal, Canada
 Munk Centre for International Studies of the University of Toronto, Canada
 Institute of International Relations Prague, Czech Republic
 Danish Institute for International Studies, Denmark
 Institute of International Studies at Universitas Gadjah Mada, Indonesia
 International Center for Persian Studies, Iran
 Vidal Sassoon International Center for the Study of Antisemitism, Jerusalem, Israel
 Center for International and Regional Studies, Qatar
 International Centre for Studies into Communism, Romania
 CEI International Affairs of the University of Barcelona, Spain
 Bandaranaike Centre for International Studies, Sri Lanka
 Graduate Institute of International and Development Studies, Geneva, Switzerland
 Institute of International Studies at Ramkhamheang University, Thailand
 International Centre for Policy Studies, Ukraine
 International Centre for Prison Studies of the University of Essex, UK

References

See also
List of schools of international relations
International studies

Global studies research
Schools of international relations
Research institutes of international relations